The Woolwich Boys is an organized street gang based in Woolwich, South London.

History
The Woolwich Boys emerged in and are named after the Woolwich neighborhood in South London. Starting as a youth gang, mainly active in street crime, the Woolwich Boys are alleged to have grown into a well-structured criminal organization mainly involved in drug trafficking and contract killing. Younger offshoots of the gang like the so-called Younger Woolwich Boys are mostly active in violent street crime, while older members are known for operating large cocaine-trafficking rings. The Woolwich Boys are said to be highly active in the contract killing business as well, operating small hit squads involved in the taxing and occasional killing of rival drug traffickers and targets. Cleavers, as well as AK-47's are told to have been used.

In 2007, younger members of the gang fought a turf war in Woolwich with rival youths. Due to heightened police pressure in the London area, the group had by early 2013 begun moving its operations outside of the city. In August 2013, police launched dawn raids in the Greenwich borough and Gillingham on the outskirts of London, breaking up a new drug distribution set up there by alleged gang members.

References

Organizations established in the 1990s
1990s establishments in England
London street gangs
Woolwich